The 1965 European Figure Skating Championships were held at the Palace of Sports of the Central Lenin Stadium in Moscow, Soviet Union from February 11 to 15, 1965. Elite senior-level figure skaters from European ISU member nations competed for the title of European Champion in the disciplines of men's singles, ladies' singles, pair skating, and ice dancing.

Results

Men

Ladies

Pairs

Ice dancing

References

External links

 results
 ISU Report

European Figure Skating Championships, 1965
European Figure Skating Championships
European Figure Skating Championships
Figure skating in the Soviet Union
International figure skating competitions hosted by the Soviet Union
Sports competitions in Moscow
1965 in Moscow
February 1965 sports events in Europe